Japalura austeniana, also known commonly as the Abor Hills agama or Annandale's dragon, is a rare species of lizard in the family Agamidae. The species is endemic to Asia.

Etymology
The specific name, austeniana, is in honor of English topographer Henry Haversham Godwin-Austen.

Geographic range
J. austeniana is found in Bhutan and India (Assam, Arunachal Pradesh).

Type locality: "Hills near Harmatti, Assam" (= Dafla Hills, Assam, fide M.A. Smith 1935).

Rediscovery
This species, J. austeniana, was previously known only from its holotype, but was rediscovered in 2006 at Eaglenest Wildlife Sanctuary in Arunachal Pradesh.

Description
The tail is very long, .

Reproduction
J. austeniana is oviparous.

References

Further reading
Das A, Das I (2007). "Rediscovery of Mictopholis austeniana (Annandale, 1908) (Squamata: Agamidae)". Current Herpetology 26 (1): 45–47.
Smith MA (1935). The Fauna of British India, Including Ceylon and Burma. Reptilia and Amphibia. Vol. II.—Sauria. London: Secretary of State for India in Council. (Taylor and Francis, printers). xiii + 440 pp. + Plate I + 2 maps. (Mictopholis, new genus, p. 149; Mictopholis austeniana, new combination, p. 165, Figure 50).

Japalura
Lizards of Asia
Reptiles of Bhutan
Reptiles of India
Reptiles described in 1908
Taxa named by Nelson Annandale